Karishma Karki (born July 18, 1993 in Bansbari, Kathmandu, Nepal) is a Nepali Olympian swimmer.

Karki participated in the Beijing Olympics in 2008. She had already created a Nepali national record by winning 12 gold medals at the Fifth National Games. She was awarded the Best Female Player Of The Year by Nepal Sports Journalist Federation in 2009. She also participated in 9th South Asian Games held in Pakistan.

Family
Her father, Ishwor Karki is the head coach for the Nepali swimming team. She has three siblings, Kishor Karki and Kristina Karki, who were national level swimmers, and a younger brother, Kiran Karki, who at the age of 9 was already a participant in this year’s games.

Gold Medals won at Fifth National Games
200m breast-stroke
100m butterfly
50m backstroke
100m freestyle
200m freestyle
200m backstroke
50m butterfly
Women’s relay
200m individual medley
100m backstroke
100m breaststroke
50m freestyle

Education
Karishma received her undergraduate degree in architecture engineering from Khwopa Engineering College.

References
nepalnews.com/main/index.php/news-archive/4-sports/1385-rai-karki-scoop-player-of-the-year-awards-.html
sports-reference.com/olympics/athletes/ka/karishma-karki-1.html
playgroundnepal.blogspot.com/2009/04/karisma-karki-bagged-10-gold-medals.html
myrepublica.com/portal/index.php?action=news_details&news_id=3609

External links
 

1993 births
Living people
Nepalese female swimmers
Sportspeople from Kathmandu
Olympic swimmers of Nepal
Swimmers at the 2008 Summer Olympics
21st-century Nepalese women